The following are lists of the largest banks in the world, as measured by total assets.

By total assets 
The list is based on the April 2022 S&P Global Market Intelligence report of the 100 largest banks in the world. The ranking was based upon assets as reported and was not adjusted for different accounting treatments.

Accounting treatment affects the assets reported: for example, the United States uses US GAAP (as opposed to IFRS), which only reports the net derivative position in most cases, leading to US banks having fewer derivative assets than comparable non-US banks. If JPMorgan Chase reported under the IFRS, it would be ranked 4th on the list , rather than 5th.

Banks by country or territory

See also 
 List of systemically important banks
 List of largest banks in the Americas
 List of largest banks in North America
 List of largest banks in Latin America
 List of largest banks in the United States
 List of largest banks in Southeast Asia

References

Legal entities
Largest
Banks